The 5000 metres speed skating event was part of the speed skating at the 1928 Winter Olympics programme. The competition was held on Monday, 13 February 1928. Thirty-three speed skaters from 14 nations competed.

Medalists

Records
These were the standing world and Olympic records (in minutes) prior to the 1928 Winter Olympics.

(*) The record was set on naturally frozen ice.

Results

References

External links
Official Olympic Report
 

Speed skating at the 1928 Winter Olympics